The Journal of Social Ontology is a peer-reviewed interdisciplinary academic journal with a focus on social ontology and collective intentionality.
It is supported by International Social Ontology Society. The journal's editor-in-chief is Hans Bernhard Schmid.

Abstracting and Indexing
The journal is indexed in:

References

External links

Publications established in 2015
English-language journals
De Gruyter academic journals
Social ontology
Social philosophy journals
Creative Commons Attribution-licensed journals